Hazel Hotchkiss won the singles tennis title of the 1909 U.S. Women's National Singles Championship by defeating reigning champion Maud Barger-Wallach 6–0, 6–1 in the challenge round. Hotchkiss had won the right to challenge Barger-Wallach by defeating Louise Hammond 6–8, 6–1, 6–4 in the final of the All Comers' competition. The event was played on outdoor grass courts and held at the Philadelphia Cricket Club in Wissahickon Heights, Chestnut Hill, Philadelphia from June 21 through June 27, 1909.

Draw

Challenge round

All Comers' finals

References

1909
1909 in women's tennis
June 1909 sports events
1909 in American women's sports
Women's Singles
Chestnut Hill, Philadelphia
1900s in Philadelphia
1909 in sports in Pennsylvania
Women's sports in Pennsylvania